Qingchun Square is a metro station on Line 2 of the Hangzhou Metro in China. It is located in the Jianggan District of Hangzhou.

Address: Qingchun Shangquan, Jianggan District, Hangzhou, China

Description 
Opened: 3 July 2017

References

Railway stations in Zhejiang
Railway stations in China opened in 2017
Hangzhou Metro stations